Vorderweidenthal is a municipality in Südliche Weinstraße district, in Rhineland-Palatinate, Western Germany.

History

Population and Religion
In 2007, 64.3 percent of the population were Protestant and 22.8 percent Catholic. The other belonged to a different religion or had no religion.

Data taken from end of year information.

References

Municipalities in Rhineland-Palatinate
Palatinate Forest